Horizoner is the debut studio album by American metal band Bloodhorse.

Track listing
 "A Good Son" - 9:55
 "A Passing Thought to the Contrary" - 4:29
 "The Old Man" - 6:58
 "Nonhossono" - 4:32
 "Close, But Never So" - 2:53
 "Aphoristic" - 2:38
 "Morning Burial" - 7:26
 "Paranoiac" - 3:46
 "In Horror" - 6:49

References

2009 debut albums
Bloodhorse (band) albums